Alaa-Aldin Dali (born 3 January 1997) is a Syrian footballer who plays for Al-Fotuwa as a striker.

International goals

References

External links
 
 

1997 births
Living people
Syrian footballers
Syrian expatriate footballers
Syria international footballers
Syria youth international footballers
Qatar SC players
Amanat Baghdad players
Tishreen SC players
Al-Arabi SC (Kuwait) players
Iraqi Premier League players
Kuwait Premier League players
Expatriate footballers in Qatar
Expatriate footballers in Iraq
Expatriate footballers in Kuwait
Syrian expatriate sportspeople in Qatar
Syrian expatriate sportspeople in Iraq
Syrian expatriate sportspeople in Kuwait
Association football forwards
Al-Shabab SC (Kuwait) players